Happy Valley Jewish Cemetery, Hong Kong is the main Jewish cemetery in Happy Valley, Hong Kong. The cemetery is located on Shan Kwong Road and is managed by Jones Lang Lasalle Management Services.

History
The burial ground was opened in 1855 by Reuben David Sassoon on former farmland acquired by his father David Sassoon of the Anglo-Jewish Sassoon family from the British Crown to serve the Jewish community in Hong Kong. Additional land was acquired in 1904 for space for a chapel and other buildings.

Burial

There are over 300 graves including those of the Kadoorie family. The first burial took place in 1857. Also this cemetery are two war graves of World War II and one non-war service grave which are maintained by the Commonwealth War Graves Commission.

See also
 List of cemeteries in Hong Kong

References

External links

 

Jewish cemeteries in Hong Kong
Commonwealth War Graves Commission cemeteries in Hong Kong
1855 establishments in Hong Kong
Happy Valley, Hong Kong
Cemeteries established in the 1850s